Saint-Léger-du-Bourg-Denis is a commune in the Seine-Maritime department in the Normandy region in northern France.

Geography

History

Etymology
The current official name of the town derives from a mistaken etymology dating back to French Revolution. Political authorities have retained and not reformed this quaint error to the present day. A more rational name would be "Saint-Léger-Bourdeny", after its ancient name "Bourdeny", a Gallo-Roman toponym in -acum, formed with the Germanic personal name Burdinus, thus Burdiniacum > Bourdeny. Burdinus, a given name, gave rise to the patronymic surnames  Bourdain and Bourdin, common in west central France.

A similar name can be found in the Merovingian toponym Bourdainville.

Heraldry

Population

Places of interest
 The church of St.Léger, dating from the sixteenth century.
 The debris of a tenth-century castle.

See also
Communes of the Seine-Maritime department

References

External links

Official website of Saint-Léger-du-Bourg-Denis 

Communes of Seine-Maritime